Live from the Bataclan is a live EP by singer-songwriter Jeff Buckley, released in October 1995 (see 1995 in music).
It was recorded at the Bataclan in Paris, France, in early 1995.

Track listing
"Dream Brother" (Jeff Buckley, Mick Grøndahl, Matt Johnson) – 7:26
"The Way Young Lovers Do" (Van Morrison) – 12:12
Also includes a short improv of "Ivo" (Cocteau Twins) at about 9:10
"Medley" – 5:40
"Je n'en connais pas la fin" (Raymond Asso, Marguerite Monnot) – 5:40
"Hymne à l'amour" (Monnot, Édith Piaf) – 5:40
"Hallelujah" (Leonard Cohen) – 9:25

Track listing – version promotion
"The Way Young Lovers Do" (Van Morrison) – 12:12
Also includes a short improv of "Ivo" (Cocteau Twins) at about 9:10
"Medley" – 5:40
"Je n'en connais pas la fin" (Raymond Asso, Marguerite Monnot) – 5:40
"Hymne à l'amour" (Monnot, Édith Piaf) – 5:40
"Hallelujah" (Leonard Cohen) – 9:25

Personnel
Jeff Buckley – guitar, vocals

Production
Producer: Steve Berkowitz
Mastering: Vlado Meller

References 

Jeff Buckley albums
1995 EPs
Live EPs
1995 live albums